The Burning Secret is a 1923 German silent drama directed by Rochus Gliese and starring Ernst Deutsch, Otto Gebühr, and Wilhelm Diegelmann. It was based on the novel by Stefan Zweig which was later adapted into a 1933 film of the same name

Cast

See also
 Burning Secret (1988)

References

Bibliography

External links

1923 films
1923 drama films
German drama films
Films of the Weimar Republic
Films directed by Rochus Gliese
German silent feature films
German black-and-white films
Films based on works by Stefan Zweig
Films based on short fiction
Silent drama films
1920s German films